G.D. Jones (born 1 April 1986) is a retired tennis player from New Zealand.

Jones has a career high ATP singles ranking of 604 achieved on 24 November 2008. He also has a career high ATP doubles ranking of 206 achieved on 16 November 2009.

Jones represented New Zealand at the Davis Cup, where he had a record of 10–3.

Career titles

Doubles: 12 (1 Challenger, 11 ITF)

National participation

Davis Cup (10 wins, 3 losses)

   indicates the result of the Davis Cup match followed by the score, date, place of event, the zonal classification and its phase, and the court surface.

External links
 
 
 
 

1986 births
Living people
New Zealand male tennis players
Tennis players from Auckland